Chiloda (Naroda), also known as Nana Chiloda, is a census town in Gandhinagar district  in the state of Gujarat, India.

Demographics
 India census, Chiloda (Naroda) had a population of 7355
. Males constituted 55% of the population and females 45%. Chiloda (Gandhinagar) has an average literacy rate of 65%, higher than the national average of 59.5%; with male literacy of 76% and female literacy of 51%. 15% of the population is under 6 years of age.

References

Cities and towns in Gandhinagar district